The Oruro Technical University, or UTO, is one of ten public universities in Bolivia. It is located in the city of Oruro.

The university was created on 15 October 1892 and was named Distrito Universitario de Oruro. It changed its name in 1937 to Universidad San Agustín and finally adopted its current name in 1941 under the dean, Josermo Murillo Vacarreza (1897–1987).

Engineering College 
One of UTO's most prestigious colleges is the "Facultad Nacional de Ingeniería" (National Engineering School).

Postgraduate and Scientific Research Office
The future vision of Oruro Technical University is to obtain grant-supported projects in all of its academic research areas.

The postgraduate program amalgamates relevant scientific research in its doctoral programs, working with national and international academic researchers.  It aims to train scientists in critical and creative thinking, and to promote research in many scientific areas.

References

External links
Universidad Tecnica de Oruro home page (in Spanish)
Facultad Nacional de Ingeneria de Bolivia home page (in Spanish)

Universities in Bolivia
Educational institutions established in 1892
1892 establishments in Bolivia
Oruro